Wait a Minim! (1962–68) was a musical  revue conceived by Leon Gluckman, with original songs by Jeremy Taylor, and a collection of international folk music arranged by Andrew Tracey. Many authentic instruments were played to accompany dances and pantomimes satirizing the national characteristics and political and social eccentricities of many different countries. The only spoken words were when the cast was introduced, and in the South African scene where apartheid was ridiculed.

The revue originated in South Africa and toured Southern Rhodesia (now Zimbabwe), and London before opening on Broadway in New York City.

South African debut
The show opened in Johannesburg on January 17, 1962, at the Intimate Theatre.

London production
After more than two years in Africa, the show moved to London, where it opened at the Fortune Theatre on April 9, 1964.

Devised and directed by Leon Gluckman
Musical arrangements and direction by Andrew Tracey
Costumes by Heather MacDonald-Rouse
Choreography by Frank Staff and Kendrew Lascelles
Lighting and design supervised by Klaus Holm 
Cast in London
   Andrew Tracey
   Paul Tracey 
   Jeremy Taylor 
   Kendrew Lascelles
   Michel Martel
   Zelide Jeppe 
   Jeannette James 
   Dana Valery

Broadway production
After more than two years in London, the show moved to  Broadway, where it opened at the John Golden Theatre on 7 March 1966, and ran for 456 performances until 15 April 1967. The U.S. cast included Sarah Atkinson, Kendrew Lascelles, Michel Martel, April Olrich, Nigel Pegram, Andrew Tracey, Paul Tracey, and Dana Valery. It was directed by Leon Gluckman and choreographed by Frank Staff and Kendrew Lascelles. Scenic design was by Gluckman and Frank Rembach, costume design by Heather Macdonald-Rouse, and lighting design by Rembach and Gluckman. Guitar, drums and other instruments were played by Andrew Tracey, Paul Tracey and Nigel Pegram, and trumpet by Kendrew Lascelles. Other members of the cast played percussion instruments. Olrich and Pegram were married for 46 years after meeting in this production.

Songs on cast recordings

London recording
   This is the Land (1) (Ndinosara Nani? - Hoe Ry Die Boere - Chuzi Mama Gwabi Gwabi - Asubuhi Sana - Jikel' Emaweni)
   Foyo
   The Crow
   Lalirette
   Last Summer
   Hammer Song
   Black-White Calypso
   Opening Knight
   Table Bay
   Ag Pleez Deddy
   This is the Land (2)
   North of the 'Popo'

Broadway recording
   Amasalela
   Ndinosara Nani?
   Jikele Maweni
   Black-White Calypso
   I Know Where I'm Going
   I Gave My Love a Cherry
   Chuzi Mama Gwabi Gwabi
   Foyo
   London Talking Blues
   Ayama
   The Gumboot Dance
   Hammer Song
   Table Bay
   A Piece of Ground
   Dirty Old Town
   Sir Oswald Sodde
   Johnny Solier
   Skalo-Zwi
   Amasalela

South African recording
  Hush Little Baby
  I Came Home
  Jo'burg Talking Blues
  I Know Where I'm Going
  I Gave My Love A Cherry
  Black-White Calypso
  Little Sir Hugh
  The Cruel Youth
  The Bold Logger
  The Strangest Dream
  Confession
  The Ballad Of The Southern Suburbs
  Hammer Song
  Single Girl
  Deutsches Weinlied...Watschplattltanz
  Ayama
  This Is South Africa
  Amasalela

References

Citations

Sources

1966 musicals
Broadway musicals
Revues
South African musicals